HMS Wolfhound was one of 21 W-class destroyers built for the Royal Navy during the First World War. Completed in 1918 the ship only played a minor role in the war before its end. The ship was converted into an anti-aircraft escort destroyer during the Second World War and was badly damaged during the Dunkirk evacuation. Wolfhound survived the war and was sold for scrap in 1948.

Description
The W class was a repeat of the preceding V-class armed with triple torpedo tube mounts. They displaced  at normal load. The ships' complement was 104 officers and ratings.

The ships were powered by a single Brown-Curtis geared steam turbine that drove two propeller shafts using steam provided by three Yarrow boilers.

The W-class ships were armed with four single QF  Mk V guns protected by gun shields. The guns were arranged in two superfiring pairs, one each fore and aft of the superstructure. They were equipped with a single QF  anti-aircraft gun on a platform abaft of the aft funnel. They were also fitted with two rotating triple mounts for  torpedoes amidships.

Construction and career
Wolfhound, the first ship of her name to serve in the Royal Navy, was ordered on 9 December 1916 as part of the Tenth War Programme from Fairfield Shipbuilding & Engineering Company. The ship was laid down at the company's Govan shipyard in April 1917, launched on 14 March 1918 and commissioned on 27 April.

First World War and inter-war period
Wolfhound was commissioned too late to see much active service in the First World War.  She was assigned to the 13th Destroyer Flotilla with the Grand Fleet in May, and was assigned to the 2nd Destroyer Flotilla in March 1919. Whilst serving with the Sixth Destroyer Flotillas of the Atlantic Fleet in January 1930, Wolfhound was one of seven V- and W-class destroyers damaged in a storm.

Second World War
After the Second World War began in September 1939 she was one of the old V and W class ships to be selected to be converted to an anti-aircraft ("Wair") escort destroyer, As the Allied forces retreated, Wolfhound was one of the ships detached to support the evacuation of troops from France, and on 25 May she and her sister  bombarded advancing German units near Calais. The following day Wolfhound ferried a shore party to Dunkirk to coordinate the evacuation; on her return voyage to Dover she loaded 142 troops. On 29 May she was badly damaged at Dunkirk by German bombers, having her back broken. After lengthy repairs she returned to service. After VE Day she was detached to support the re-occupation of Norway. On 14 May she and Wolsey were deployed with Norwegian corvettes to cover minesweeping operations prior to the re-occupation of Bergen.

Wolfhound was transferred to BISCO on 18 February 1948 and was towed to the River Forth later that year to be broken up by Granton Shipbreakers.

Citations

Bibliography

External links
 battleships-cruisers.co.uk
 naval-history.net

 

V and W-class destroyers of the Royal Navy
1918 ships
Ships built on the River Clyde